Eugene Murtagh (born 23 June 1942) is an Irish billionaire businessman, and the founder and chairman of Kingspan Group, a building materials manufacturer.

Early life
Eugene Murtagh was born on 23 June 1942, in Kingscourt, County Cavan, Ireland, where he grew up in the same street as his future wife Andrea Carolan.

Career
In the early 1960s, when he was a fitter and she a hairdresser, they started a business making trailers. He founded Kingspan in 1971.

Murtagh is chairman of Kingspan, and was CEO until 2005, when he was succeeded by his son, Gene Murtagh. He owns 16% of Kingspan.

Personal life
He was married to Andrea Carolan until her death in 2014, and they had five children together. He lives in Kingscourt, County Cavan, Ireland.

References

Living people
1942 births
Irish billionaires
Irish company founders
People from County Cavan